Baruasagar is a town and a municipal board in Jhansi district  in the state of Uttar Pradesh, India. It was named so because of the beautiful lake called Baruasagar Tal.
Maharshi Shringirishi Temple is also located near lakeside.

Demographics
 India census, Baruasagar had a population of 22,075. Males constitute 53% of the population and females 47%. Baruasagar has an average literacy rate of 71.62%, higher than the state average of 67.68%; with 81.07% of the males and 61.43% of females literate. 13% of the population is under 6 years of age. Human sex ratio of Baruasagar is 920 females per 1000 males which is higher than state average of 912. However, child sex ratio of Baruasagar is 873 compared to state average of 902 females per thousand males. 92% of the population of Baruasagar is Hindu, 6.48% Muslim, 0.04% Christian, 1.95% Jains and other minority groups.
Near Baruasagar there is a village by the name of Sinoniyan khas or Sinoniyan east, where an ancient and holy Hindu pilgrimage Temple of Maa Tara (माँ तारा मंदिर)is located on a mountain peak.

References

1 2011 census report on population of Baruasagar.

Cities and towns in Jhansi district